Robert Roxburgh (5 February 1896–1974) was an English footballer who played in the Football League for Blackburn Rovers and Newcastle United.

References

1896 births
1974 deaths
English footballers
English football managers
English expatriate football managers
Association football forwards
English Football League players
Newcastle United F.C. players
Blackburn Rovers F.C. players
Heracles Almelo managers
English expatriate sportspeople in the Netherlands
Expatriate football managers in the Netherlands